The 2011 Major League Baseball draft was held from June 6 through June 8, 2011, from Studio 42 of the MLB Network in Secaucus, New Jersey. The Pittsburgh Pirates selected Gerrit Cole out of the University of California, Los Angeles, with the first overall pick.

Draft order
The draft order was determined by the 2010 Major League Baseball standings.  The Pittsburgh Pirates received the first pick after having the worst record in 2010.

The Arizona Diamondbacks, San Diego Padres, and Milwaukee Brewers each received a compensation pick for failing to sign draft picks from the 2010 draft.  Also, teams lost draft picks for signing certain free agents, while teams losing free agents received draft picks as compensation. The Elias Sports Bureau ranks all players based on performance over the past two seasons, with the top 20% being considered "Type A" and the next 20% considered "Type B". If a team offers a Type A free agent arbitration and he signs with another club, the player's former team obtains the new team's first- or second-round pick, depending on whether the new team is in the top 15 or bottom 15 in won–loss records in 2011, as well as a supplemental pick after the first round. If a team offers a Class B free agent arbitration and he signs with another club, the former team gets a supplemental pick after the first round.

On September 8, 2019, Danny Hultzen became the last of the first 29 picks to appear in a Major League game, when he made his debut for the Chicago Cubs.

First round

Supplemental first round

Compensation picks

Other notable selections
As of September 2, 2019

See also

List of first overall Major League Baseball draft picks

References

External links
2011 Baseball Draft at Baseball Almanac

Wait Til Next Year: Draft ‘11 Preview – Pitchers, by Bryan Smith - June 11, 2010, Fangraphs
https://web.archive.org/web/20100513073447/http://www.baseballrumormill.com/2010/03/2011-mlb-draft-preview/

Major League Baseball draft
Draft
Major League Baseball draft
Major League Baseball draft
Baseball in New Jersey
Events in New Jersey
Sports in Hudson County, New Jersey
Secaucus, New Jersey